Serwer is a surname. Notable people with the surname include:

Adam Serwer (born 1982), American journalist and author
Andrew Serwer (born 1959), American journalist
Daniel Serwer, American academic
Jacquelyn Serwer, American art historian and curator